Clan of Xymox is the debut studio album by Dutch dark wave band Clan of Xymox, released 1 July 1985 by 4AD.

The album was produced by 4AD co-founder Ivo Watts-Russell and recorded at Palladium Studios in Edinburgh. The remixes included on the album ("A Day" and "Stranger") were mixed and produced by John Fryer at Blackwing Studios in London. Fryer had gained notability for working with seminal bands on the 4AD, Mute, Rough Trade and Beggars Banquet record labels, including Depeche Mode, Fad Gadget and Cocteau Twins.

The album drew comparisons to Joy Division and the Cure and created a buzz in clubs. Reviewers in subsequent years have derided the album as dated and derivative, but accurately reflecting the emerging goth sound of the time, with "icy, throbbing keyboards; bummed-out vocals; chilly, robotic percussion; gloomy, ethereal guitars; and unusual, cryptic song titles".

In 1985, Melody Maker described it as "a nervous and brilliant record" from "guitar-splayed firefields of 'Cry in the Wind' and 'Stumble and Fall', and thrill(!) to the system clearing, bass bloodied '7th Time'... The range and depth of this mysterious record do not exclude arrogant electro dance anthems like 'Stranger' and 'A Day'; nor do Xymox avoid sentimentality as on 'No Human Can Drown'".

In the same year, Sounds called the album "a strange and wonderful debut from 4AD's first signing since Dead Can Dance. Particular favourite is 'A Day' which suggests so many places, colours feelings and despairs that it is totally awe inspiring".

Track listing

Personnel
Xymox
Ronny Moorings – vocals, lyrics, guitar, keyboards
Anka Wolbert – vocals, lyrics, keyboards, bass guitar
Pieter Nooten – vocals, lyrics, keyboards

Producers, engineers
Ivo Watts-Russell – producer
Jon Turner – engineer
John Fryer – engineer (producer on remixes)
Keith Mitchell – assistant engineer

Graphic design
Vaughan Oliver – graphic design

References

1985 debut albums
Dark wave albums
4AD albums
Clan of Xymox albums